Arnošt Hložek (11 December 1929 – 19 December 2013), also called Ernst Hložek, was a Slovak football coach and player.

He played for Slovan Bratislava and Inter Bratislava.

He coached Inter Bratislava, Dukla Banská Bystrica, MŠK Žilina, First Vienna, Rapid Wien, Sparta Prague, TTS Trenčín, Wiener Sport-Club, LASK and SC Zwettl.

References

External links
 

1929 births
2013 deaths
Slovak footballers
Czechoslovak footballers
Footballers from Bratislava
Association football defenders
ŠK Slovan Bratislava players
FK Inter Bratislava players
Slovak football managers
Czechoslovak football managers
AC Sparta Prague managers
LASK managers
SK Rapid Wien managers
FK Inter Bratislava managers
FK Dukla Banská Bystrica managers
Wiener Sport-Club managers
First Vienna FC managers
MŠK Žilina managers
Slovak expatriate football managers
Slovak expatriate sportspeople in Austria
Expatriate football managers in Austria